The Windrose 22 and Laguna 22 are a series of American trailerable sailboats that were designed by W. Shad Turner as cruisers and first built in 1977.

The Windrose 22 and Laguna 22 are developments of the Balboa 22, using the same hull molds.

Production
The Windrose 22 was built by Laguna Yachts in the United States, with model years from 1977 and 1987 and the Laguna 22 between 1983 and 1987, ending when Laguna Yachts went out of business in 1986. The Balboa 22 was originally designed for Coastal Recreation, but the company was bought out by Laguna Yachts in 1981 and many of its boat designs were adapted into new models. Designer W. Shad Turner drew boats for both California-based companies and did adaptations after the buy-out.

Design
The Windrose 22 and Laguna 22 are recreational keelboats, built predominantly of fiberglass, with wood trim. They have fractional sloop rigs, raked stems, plumb transoms and transom-hung rudders, controlled by a tiller.

The boats are normally fitted with a small  outboard motor for docking and maneuvering.

The designs have sleeping accommodation for four people, with a double "V"-berth in the bow cabin and two straight settee berths in the main cabin. The optional sliding galley is located on the starboard  side and slides under the cockpit for stowage. The head is located in the bow cabin under the "V"-berth.

Variants
Windrose 22
This swing keel model was introduced in 1977 and built until 1987.
Windrose 22S
This fixed, shoal-draft, fin model was introduced in 1977 and built until 1987.
Laguna 22
This fixed, shoal-draft, fin model has a new cabin top design, made with a new deck mold. It was introduced in 1983 and built until 1987.

Operational history
In a 2010 review Steve Henkel wrote, "Many skippers like to think of both the Windrose 22 and the Balboa 22 swing keel versions as very similar to both the Catalina 22 ... and the Venture 22 ... There is some merit in this appraisal, except that, while all four of the boats have roughly the same total displacement (about 1,800 to 2,300 pounds), the Windrose and Balboa have considerably more ballast and less structural materials. Best features: These were boats built for economy; used boat prices are lower than average. Worst features: Because the boats were built for economy, workmanship and quality is so-so at best."

See also
List of sailing boat types

References

Keelboats
1970s sailboat type designs
Sailing yachts
Trailer sailers
Sailboat type designs by W. Shad Turner
Sailboat types built by Laguna Yachts